Baron Mountevans, of Chelsea in the County of London, is a title in the Peerage of the United Kingdom, created in 1945 in favour of the celebrated Antarctic explorer, Admiral Sir Edward Evans.
 the title is held by his grandson, the fourth Baron, who succeeded his brother in 2014.

Barons Mountevans (1945)
Edward Ratcliffe Garth Russell Evans, 1st Baron Mountevans (1881–1957)
Richard Andvord Evans, 2nd Baron Mountevans (1918–1974)
Edward Patrick Broke Evans, 3rd Baron Mountevans (1943–2014)
Jeffrey Richard de Corban Evans, 4th Baron Mountevans (b. 1948)

The heir apparent is the present holder's son, the Hon. Alexander Richard Andvord Evans (b. 1975).

Line of Succession

  Admiral Edward Ratcliffe Garth Russell Evans, 1st Baron Mountevans (1881 – 1958)
  Richard Andvord Evans, 2nd Baron Mountevans (1918 – 1974)
  Edward Patrick Broke Evans, 3rd Baron Mountevans (1943 – 2014)
  Jeffrey de Corban Richard Evans, 4th Baron Mountevans (born 1948) (Representative peer from 2015, succeeding The Viscount Tenby)
 (1) Hon. Alexander Richard Andvord Evans (b. 1975)
 (2) Hon. Julian James Rowntree Evans (b. 1977)
 (3) Hon. Edward Broke Evans (b. 1924)
 (4) Julian Phillip Broke Evans (b. 1956)
 (5) William Garth Evans (b. 1959)

References

Sources
Kidd, Charles, Williamson, David (editors). Debrett's Peerage and Baronetage (1990 edition). New York: St Martin's Press, 1990.

External links
 www.burkespeerage.com

Baronies in the Peerage of the United Kingdom
Noble titles created in 1945